Heterolimnophila is a genus of crane fly in the family Limoniidae.

Distribution
New Zealand.

Species
H. subtruncata (Alexander, 1923)
H. truncata (Alexander, 1922)

References

Limoniidae
Nematocera genera
Diptera of Australasia